Yrjö-Koskinen is the surname of a Finnish family of Swedish descent, formerly known as Forsman, granted noble status in 1882. 

Notable people with this surname include the following:

 Baron Yrjö Sakari Yrjö-Koskinen (1830–1903) (originally known as Georg Zakarias Forsman), senator and professor, ennobled in 1882
 Sofia Theodolinda Yrjö-Koskinen, playwright, wife of Y. S. Yrjö-Koskinen
 Yrjö Yrjö-Koskinen (1854–1917), senator, elder son of Y. S. Yrjö-Koskinen
 Sakari Yrjö-Koskinen (1858–1916), rector, member of parliament, younger son of Y. S. Yrjö-Koskinen
 Iida Yrjö-Koskinen (1857–1937), member of parliament, wife of Sakari Yrjö-Koskinen
 Aarno Yrjö-Koskinen (1895–1951), ambassador, foreign minister, son of Yrjö Yrjö-Koskinen
 Kaarlo Juhana Yrjö-Koskinen (1930–2007), ambassador

References 

Finnish-language surnames
Finnish noble families
Finnish people of Swedish descent
Compound surnames